German submarine U-548 was a Type IXC U-boat of Nazi Germany's Kriegsmarine during World War II.

She was laid down at the Deutsche Werft (yard) in Hamburg as yard number 369 on 4 September 1942, launched on 14 April 1943 and commissioned on 30 June with Kapitänleutnant Eberhard Zimmermann in command.

U-548 began her service career with training as part of the 4th U-boat Flotilla from 30 June 1943. She was reassigned to the 2nd flotilla for operations on 1 April 1944, then the 33rd flotilla on 1 October.

She carried out four patrols and sank one ship.

She was sunk on 19 April 1945 by depth charges from American warships southeast of Halifax, Nova Scotia.

Design
German Type IXC/40 submarines were slightly larger than the original Type IXCs. U-548 had a displacement of  when at the surface and  while submerged. She had two shafts and two  propellers.

U-548 was fitted with six  torpedo tubes (four fitted at the bow and two at the stern), 22 torpedoes, one  SK C/32 naval gun, 180 rounds, and a  SK C/30 as well as a  C/30 anti-aircraft gun. The boat had a complement of forty-eight.

Service history

First patrol
U-548s first patrol began with her departure from Kiel on 21 March 1944. She passed through the gap separating Iceland and the Faroe Islands before heading out into the Atlantic Ocean. U-548 fired at the aircraft which in turn wrongly assumed they had been engaged by the ship. The real quarry aborted her attack and escaped.

She entered Lorient, on the French Atlantic coast, on 24 June 1944.

Second and third patrols
On her second foray, U-548 lost a man overboard, (Mechanikergefreiter (A) Walter Heise), during a crash-dive on 30 August 1944. Reversing the course of her first patrol, she arrived at Bergen in Norway, on 25 September.

Having moved to Hölen (southeast of Stavanger) in Norway, the boat began her third sortie on 7 October 1944. She docked at Flensburg on the 12th.

Fourth patrol and loss
By now, U-548 was based at Horten Naval Base (south of Oslo) also in Norway, from where she began her fourth and last patrol on 5 March 1945.

Fifty-eight men died with the U-boat; there were no survivors.

Summary of raiding history

References

Notes

Citations

Bibliography

External links

German Type IX submarines
U-boats commissioned in 1943
U-boats sunk in 1945
World War II submarines of Germany
1943 ships
World War II shipwrecks in the Atlantic Ocean
Ships built in Hamburg
U-boats sunk by depth charges
U-boats sunk by US warships
Ships lost with all hands
Maritime incidents in April 1945